Kotobuki Arena Chikuma is an arena in Chikuma, Nagano, Japan. It is the home arena of the Shinshu Brave Warriors of the B.League, Japan's professional basketball league.  Warriors also play at the Matsumoto City Gymnasium, White Ring and Big Hat in the prefecture.

External links
City Hall and Gymnasium

References

Basketball venues in Japan

Indoor arenas in Japan
Shinshu Brave Warriors
Sports venues in Nagano Prefecture